The Union Cycliste Internationale (UCI) – the governing body of cycling – categorizes teams into three divisions. The first division, consisting of the top 18 teams, are classified as UCI WorldTeams, and compete in the UCI World Tour. The second and third divisions respectively are the Professional Continental teams and the Continental teams.

Teams compete in the UCI Continental Circuits, which is divided into five continental zones: Africa, America, Asia, Europe and Oceania. Teams win points in the UCI World Ranking. Professional Continental teams are also invited to participate in events in the UCI World Tour, although they are not eligible to win points in the World Tour rankings.

List of 2019 UCI Professional Continental teams 
According to the UCI Rulebook,

"A professional continental team is an organisation created to take part in road events open to professional continental teams. It is known by a unique name and registered with the UCI in accordance with the provisions below.
 The professional continental team comprises all the riders registered with the UCI as members of the team. This includes the paying agent, the sponsors and all other persons contracted by the paying agent and/or the sponsors to provide for the continuing operation of the team (manager, team manager, coach, paramedical assistant, mechanic, etc.).
 Each professional continental team must employ at least 14 riders, 2 team managers and 3 other staff (paramedical assistants, mechanics, etc.) on a full time basis to be eligible for the whole registration year."

Aqua Blue Sport and United Healthcare folded after 2018.

CCC as well did not return but became the title sponsor of the former BMC team at the World Tour level.

Corendon Circus, Riwal Readynez, and W52/FC Porto moved up from the Continental level.

Willier Trestina Selle Italia changed sponsors to Neri Sottoli Selle Italia for 2019

Fortuno Samsic became Team Areka Samsic for 2019

Verandas Willems Crelan merged with team Roompot-Charles for 2019

Holowesko Citadel returned to the Continental level for 2019.

List of 2019 UCI Continental teams

References

2019
2019 in men's road cycling